Trương Minh Hà (born in Đà Nẵng, Vietnam), known under the stage name of Thanh Hà, is a Vietnamese American singer.

Thanh Hà‘s mother is Vietnamese. Her father was Bill Williams, an American soldier of German origin, who died at Chu Lai when she was two years old. She went to school in Đà Nẵng, and as a child she sung on Đà Nẵng radio. After graduating from high school, she moved to Saigon. In 1991 she escaped to a boat people refugee camp in the Philippines.
During a beauty contest in the refugee camp in the Philippines, she sang for the first time in front of an audience, for the talent part of the competition. She won a $150 prize, and was surprised to discover that many people liked her voice. She later immigrated to America under the Vietnamese Amerasian American Homecoming Act. She and female singer and music producer Phương Uyên got married in California, Mỹ on September 15th, 2022.

Discography
 Ru lòng khờ dại CD
 Tình yêu - duets with Tuấn Ngọc CD
 Chìa Khóa Tình Yêu CD

References

Living people
21st-century Vietnamese women singers
Vietnamese people of American descent
1969 births
Vietnamese emigrants to the United States
20th-century Vietnamese women singers
Vietnamese LGBT singers
Bisexual musicians
Vietnamese people of German descent